Teen Wolf, known as The Cartoon Adventures of Teen Wolf in the United Kingdom, is an animated television series broadcast from 1986 to 1987 that was produced by Southern Star/Hanna-Barbera Australia in association with Clubhouse Pictures in the first season and Atlantic/Kushner-Locke in the second season. It was based on the 1985 live-action film, Teen Wolf.

Summary
The series is about a teenage boy and his family who can transform into werewolves, focusing on themes of coming of age and fitting in. While generally keeping true to the main ideas, this version made some changes from the film.

Scott Howard and his family now live in the fictional town of Wolverton, a small town constantly drawing tourists because of its history of werewolf sightings. (In the film the town was called 'Beacontown'.) Scott was an only child who lived with his father in the film, the cartoon gave him a little sister and grandparents.

Despite the youth audience, the cartoon series delivered very powerful critiques of disability as civil rights. Freely invoking an asthma attack or seizure, the series centered on how Scott felt "weird" immediately before and during his werewolf transformation.

Although he never hurt anybody while he was a werewolf, Scott was conscious of his difference from other teenagers and had to make accommodations for himself. He also expressed frustration that the residents of this town had stereotyped "his people". Boof's father Mayor Marconi is a semi-antagonist to the Howard family in the cartoon and is unaware his daughter is in love with a werewolf. But he never appears in the earlier live-action film.

A jock named Mick who now also attends Wolverton High constantly picks on Scott for being the "outsider". Mick attended a different high school in the film. Pamela is a cheerleader in the cartoon while in the film she really did not show much school spirt.

Characters

 Scott Howard (voiced by Townsend Coleman), the main protagonist; he constantly chases local cheerleader and popular girl Pam, while being thwarted by Pam's boyfriend Mick McAllister, a mean jock. Scott spends much of his time worrying about social acceptance and the possibility of people finding out he's a werewolf. Unlike the movie, Scott is not on a sports team but still wears a letterman jacket. 
 Harold Howard (voiced by James Hampton, the only actor that reprised his role from the live-action film), Scott's widower father; a laid-back hardware store owner, generally uninterested in the social problems of his son. He seldom transforms.
 Lupe Howard (voiced by Sherry Lynn), Scott's younger sister is one of the new characters added for the animated series. She is not old enough to know whether she is a werewolf or not, but she desperately wants to be one. In one episode, she is able to transform because of a magic spell, but since the spell turns anyone into a werewolf temporarily, she still does not know her true status. 
 Grandpa Howard (voiced by Stacy Keach Sr.), Scott's grandfather is an immigrant from Transylvania. He spends most of his time in his werewolf form, only assuming a completely human appearance when he must. He is a constant source of embarrassment to Scott, because he is always running around on all fours, chasing cats, and getting into trouble with the neighbors. He is another new character added for the cartoon. 
 Grandma Howard (voiced by June Foray), Scott's grandmother; also from Transylvania and, like Grandpa, she stays in werewolf form most of the time. She is not as embarrassing to Scott because she is better behaved than Grandpa. She becomes Scott's ally in his attempts to keep Grandpa's behavior under control. She is sometimes represented as a fortune teller similar to a stereotypical Gypsy, and has sometimes performed other magic, such as brewing potions, making her seem similar to a witch in some ways. She is another new character added for the cartoon. 
 Rupert "Stiles" Stilinski (voiced by Don Most), Scott's best friend; in on the werewolf secret, Stiles is supportive but often gets under-appreciated in Scott's quest to be "in" with the cool crowd. Like Lupe, he wishes to be a werewolf and is upset that Scott doesn't appreciate the "gift".
 Chubs (voiced by Will Ryan) Another friend of Scott's; who is in on  the werewolf secret. Chubs is more trustworthy than Styles and says much less. Unlike the film version he is not on any sports team but still loves to eat.  
 Lisa "Boof" Marconi (voiced by Jeannie Elias), a friend of Scott's, and is also in on his family's werewolf secret alongside Stiles. She is romantically interested in him, but he seems oblivious of this, chasing after Pam instead.
Mayor Marconi (voiced by Frank Welker and Kenneth Mars) Boof's father and the Wolverton mayor, oblivious to the Howards, not a 'mean' person but occasionally gets tricked into supporting dangerous things which would hurt his constituents. He was added for the cartoon and had not appeared in the movie.
 Pamela Wells (voiced by Ellen Gerstell), the most popular girl in Wolverton High and serving as a cheerleader, she is Scott's romantic interest. She is the girlfriend of Mick McAllister, who sometimes thwarts Scott and picks on him for being an outsider. Pam is unaware that Scott is a werewolf like his family before him, like everybody in Wolverton who doesn't know the Howard family's secret.
 Mick McAllister (voiced by Craig Sheffer), a mean jock at Wolverton High, he is the boyfriend of Pamela Wells who thwarts Scott and picks on him for being an outsider in Wolverton. Mick, like Pam and everybody else in town, is unaware that Scott and his family are werewolves.
 Mrs. Seslick (voiced by June Foray), the Howard family's nosy neighbor who is always a step away from figuring out the family's secret and outing them to the community. She is the last new character added just for the cartoon.

Cast
 Sheryl Bernstein as Frieda the Housekeeper
 Townsend Coleman as Scott Howard
 Brian Cummings 
 Jeannie Elias as Lisa "Boof" Marconi
 June Foray as Grandma Howard, Mrs. Seslick
 Ellen Gerstell - Pamela Wells
 James Hampton as Harold Howard
 Stacy Keach, Sr. as Grandpa Howard
 Kenneth Mars as Mayor Marconi (first voice)
 Mona Marshall
 Don Most as Stiles
 Will Ryan as Chubs
 Craig Sheffer as Mick McAllister
 Frank Welker as Valor, Daisy, Mayor Marconi (second voice)

History
Although the cartoon series ran for three years, the third year was entirely reruns. The main character dressed in similar clothing to the cartoon Scott Howard, the "wolfman" design was nearly identical, and the quests to hide the secret and fit in at high school are features of the cartoon and not the film.

Episodes

Season 1 (1986)

Season 2 (1987)

Home media

Video releases

United Kingdom

United States

DVD releases
In 2017, Shout! Factory was set to release the entire Teen Wolf animated series on DVD-Video in Region 1 for the very first time in September of that year. However, on 29 June 2017 Shout! Factory announced via Twitter that the release was delayed pending the resolution of a previously unforeseen legal issue.

References

External links

Teen Wolf
1986 American television series debuts
1987 American television series endings
1980s American animated television series
1986 Australian television series debuts
1987 Australian television series endings
American animated television spin-offs
Australian television spin-offs
CBS original programming
Television series by Endemol Australia
Television series by Hanna-Barbera
Animated television shows based on films
Television series about shapeshifting
Television series about werewolves

American children's animated adventure television series
American children's animated fantasy television series
American children's animated horror television series
American children's animated supernatural television series
Australian children's animated adventure television series
Australian children's animated fantasy television series
Australian children's animated horror television series
English-language television shows
Teen animated television series